Hot & Heavy-Handed is the second studio album released by American country music and Americana artist Izaak Opatz. Released on December 11, 2020, it features nine covers from the likes of Clint Black, Mark Chesnutt and Dierks Bentley, along with two original tracks by Opatz. 

During the 2020 COVID-19 pandemic in the United States, Opatz had to cancel an upcoming multi-state tour with 16 dates. He returned to his previous summer job of working on the trail crews in Glacier National Park, as well as participating in multiple live-streaming events.

Rolling Stone said that Opatz's cover of "Drunk on a Plane" "understands the song's pitiful core even better than the original. When Opatz sings, 'I'm up so high, I may never come down,' it sounds as hard-to-believe as ever."

Track listing
"Goin' Through the Big D" – 2:34
"I Left Something Turned On at Home – 3:05
"Tulsa Telephone Book" – 2:29
"What Are Those Things (With Big Black Wings)" – 2:06
"A Better Man" – 3:01
"Lubbock for Love" – 4:44
"Sundays" – 3:55
"You Look Like I Need a Drink" – 3:07
"Can't Break It to My Heart" – 3:04
"Drunk on a Plane" – 3:47
"You Made a Country Singer out of Me" – 3:34

References

External links
 https://oldrookie.com/2020/12/07/izaak-opatz-chats-pop-country-covers-record-hot-heavy-handed-interview/
 https://theindiemachine.com/2020/12/14/💿-izaak-opatz-hot-heavy-handed/
 https://flatheadbeacon.com/2020/12/18/covering-the-classics/

2020 albums
Covers albums